The men's 110 metres hurdles event at the 1990 World Junior Championships in Athletics was held in Plovdiv, Bulgaria, at Deveti Septemvri Stadium on 10 and 11 August.  106.7 cm (3'6) (senior implement) hurdles were used.

Medalists

Results

Final
11 August
Wind: -0.2 m/s

Semifinals
11 August

Semifinal 1
Wind: +1.0 m/s

Semifinal 2
Wind: +3.1 m/s

Heats
10 August

Heat 1
Wind: +0.7 m/s

Heat 2
Wind: +0.3 m/s

Heat 3
Wind: +0.6 m/s

Heat 4
Wind: +0.3 m/s

Participation
According to an unofficial count, 27 athletes from 20 countries participated in the event.

References

110 metres hurdles
Sprint hurdles at the World Athletics U20 Championships